A list of the films produced in Mexico in 1972 (see 1972 in film):

See also
1972 in Mexico

External links

1972
Films
Lists of 1972 films by country or language